This is a list of American football players who have played for the New York Yankees (NFL) in the National Football League (NFL) as well as those who played for the franchise during their time in the first American Football League.  It includes players that have played at least one match in the AFLI or NFL regular season.  The Yankees franchise was founded in 1926 and lasted until 1928.


B
Red Badgro,
Bullet Baker,
John Bayley,
Bob Beattie

C
Art Coglizer,
John Colahan,
Mush Crawford,
Hec Cyre

E
Jack Ernst,
Jug Earp

F
Ray Flaherty,
Wes Fry

G
Ed Gallagher,
Art Garvey,
Paul G. Goebel,
Gus Goetz,
Red Grange,
Hal Griffen,
Frank Grube

H
Dick Hall,
Norm Harvey,
Murrell Hogue,
Pooley Hubert

K
Frank Kearney,
Bill Kelly,
Fritz Kramer,
Louie Kolls,
Leo Kriz

L
Jim Lawson,
Harvey Levy,
Verne Lewellen

M
Red Maloney,
Larry Marks,
Jack McArthur,
Joe McClain,
Frank McGrath,
Mike Michalske,
Paul Minick,
Bo Molenda,
Bob Morrow

O
Bill Oliver,
Forrest Olson,
Lowell Otte

P
George Pease,
William Pritchard

R
Frank Racis,
Dick Rauch,
Cobb Rooney

S
Sam Salemi,
Steve Schimititisch,
Ralph Scott,
Red Smith,
Ray Stephens,
Art Stevenson

T
Eddie Tryon

W
Gibby Welch

References
List of NY Yankees AFL players
List of NY Yankees 1927 NFL players
List of NY Yankees 1928 NFL players

 
Lists of players by National Football League team
Lists of players by American Football League (1926) team